Aranama may refer to:

 Aranama people, a historic ethnic group of Texas
 Aranama language, an extinct language of Texas